Astonfield Renewables Resources is a renewable energy company that builds, owns, and operates utility-scale solar power plants in emerging markets. Headquartered in Mumbai, its operational focus on India is supported by additional offices in New Delhi and Kolkata.

History
Astonfield was founded in 2005 by Ameet Shah and Sourabh Sen. As an early entrant in the Indian solar market, Astonfield won one of the first solar project contracts in the country under the Jawaharlal Nehru National Solar Mission. This project, a 5 MW solar photovoltaic project at Osiyan, Rajasthan, was commissioned under the Migration Phase of the National Solar Mission, which incorporated projects already under advanced development when the Mission was launched in 2009.

U.S.-India Partnerships
In 2011, the United States Trade and Development Agency (USTDA) announced a series of agreements at the conclusion of the U.S.-India Strategic Dialogue to enhance trade opportunities between the two countries. Astonfield received a $719,985 grant to assist in the design and deployment of two solar projects in India.

In 2010, the U.S.-India Business Council, a business advocacy organization that represents U.S. companies in India and global Indian companies, selected Astonfield’s Chief Operating Officer Aparna Doshi to their Solar Power Task Force, which was an initiative to promote trade and investment in solar power.

In 2010, Astonfield was awarded the Export Achievement Award by the U.S. Department of Commerce, as well as the Global Green Award at World Trade Week NYC.

Projects
As an early mover in the Indian solar market, Astonfield’s projects were 2-12 MW in size. They are gravitating toward larger projects of 25 MW and above in the coming year. In July 2013, Astonfield received an A− credit rating on loan facilities for its 5 MW solar plant in Osiyan, Rajasthan, from Credit Rating Information Services of India Limited (CRISIL), a division of the McGraw Hill Corporation and whose majority stakeholder is Standard & Poor’s. It was one of the first solar plants to have received an A level credit rating in India.

Power plants

See also
 Solar power in India
 Osian
 Solar Energy Corporation of India

References

External links
 

Solar energy companies of India
Companies based in Mumbai
Energy companies established in 2005
Renewable resource companies established in 2005
Indian companies established in 2005
2005 establishments in Maharashtra